County Durham and Darlington NHS Foundation Trust is an NHS Foundation Trust based in North East England. It runs two acute hospitals in University Hospital of North Durham and Darlington Memorial Hospital as well as further non-acute centres at Shotley Bridge Hospital, Sedgefield Community Hospital, Richardson Community Hospital, Weardale Community Hospital, Bishop Auckland Hospital and Chester-le-Street Hospital. The Chief Executive is Sue Jacques. The most recent review of the Trust by the Care Quality Commission in 2019 provided an "Overall: Good" rating.

In 2015 the trust established a subsidiary company, Synchronicity Care Ltd. The intention was to achieve VAT benefits, as well as pay bill savings, by recruiting new staff on less expensive non-NHS contracts. VAT benefits arise because NHS trusts can only claim VAT back on a small subset of goods and services they buy. The Value Added Tax Act 1994 provides a mechanism through which NHS trusts can qualify for refunds on contracted out services.

In 2018 it made a 14-year managed service agreement with Royal Philips Electronics to run imaging and cardiology services across four sites.

Performance

The Trust logged 1570 breaches of the 30 minute handover rule from ambulances to its A&E department during 2013 as well as 360 breaches of the 60 minute target, triggering fines of £674,000.

A Care Quality Commission survey found that the Trust was among the best in England for its maternity services in December 2013. A subsequent review by the CQC noted that "People were not being protected from the risks of unsafe or inappropriate care and treatment because accurate and appropriate records were not always being maintained."

From September 2017 all referrals to the trust are made electronically using the NHS e-Referral Service. This has reduced the rate of patients missing appointments from 10% to 5%.

Research 
The Trust set up trial of a digital self-testing service for patients using Warfarin in 2013. They are given a Roche CoaguChek XS monitor and testing strips. This gives a reading of their international normalised ratio, a measure of how quickly blood clots – which they can share with clinic staff via an automated phone call. The software which drives the automated process is produced by Inhealthcare Ltd. The 200 patients on the trial improved the time they were in therapeutic range from 60% of the time to 75% which reduces the risk of complications.  They no longer have to come to the hospital every two weeks and are less likely to be admitted. Patients are enthusiastic about the benefits.

It set up an artificial intelligence model using risk stratification digital tools to protect patients from acute kidney injury in 2021.  Hospital-acquired acute kidney injury fell by more than 80%.  This saved the trust more than £2 million in direct costs.

Education 
The trust currently hosts medical students from Newcastle University Medical School across sites.

See also
 List of NHS trusts

References

External links 
 
 County Durham and Darlington NHS Foundation Trust on the NHS website
 Care Quality Commission inspection reports